Toey Tiew Thai: The Route (lit. Thailand Tourism: The Route) is a Thai travel and lifestyle television show hosted by Tatchakorn Boonlapayanan (Godji), Kittipat Chalaruk (Golf), Watchara Sukchum (Jennie) and Niti Chaichitathorn (Pompam). Produced by GMMTV, the show premiered in Thailand on 8 October 2011 on  then moved to One31 and eventually to GMM 25.

Hosts

Main hosts 
 Tatchakorn Boonlapayanan (Godji)
 Kittipat Chalaruk (Golf)
 Watchara Sukchum (Jennie)

Occasional host 
 Niti Chaichitathorn (Pompam)

References

External links 
 Toey Tiew Thai: The Route on GMM 25 website 
 เทยเที่ยวไทย (Toey Tiew Thai) on LINE TV
 
 GMMTV

GMM 25 original programming
Travel television series
Thai television shows
Thai LGBT-related television shows
2010s LGBT-related television series